

Within the Christian tradition, bridal theology, also referred to as mystical marriage, is the New Testament portrayal of communion with Jesus as a marriage, and God's reign as a wedding banquet. This tradition in turn traces back to the Hebrew Bible, especially allegorical interpretations of the erotic Song of Songs (or Song of Solomon). 

In Christianity, bridal theology plays a role in the lives of those who become Catholic, Lutheran and Anglican nuns and religious sisters; for this reason, nuns and religious sisters are often termed "brides of Christ" . Additionally, those who dedicate their lives as consecrated virgins live as a "spouse of Christ", spending their lives devoted to serving in the local church and praying for all the faithful (being gifted a breviary after undergoing the rite). Expanding on this, in The Harvard Ichthus, Jane Thomas explained that in a sense, all Christian women are brides of Christ:

Bridal theology has influenced the works of, among others, Henry Suso, Catherine of Siena, Teresa of Ávila, Gregory the Great and Bernard of Clairvaux.

Analogous concepts 
A similar concept existed in Valentinian Gnosticism with the notion of the Bridal Chamber, which involved a marriage to one's heavenly counterpart. Some mystics take this "marriage" as a symbol of the union of the human soul with God.

See also

 Bride of Christ
 Christian headcovering
 Mystic marriage of Saint Catherine
 Spirit spouse

References

Christian mysticism
Marriage and religion
Christian terminology